Joel Douek is a film and television composer. His documentary works include Galapagos 3D about life on the Galápagos Islands, The Wildest Dream about Mount Everest, and Flying Monsters 3D about the pterosaurs. In addition to documentaries, he has also provided the music to the English adaptations of anime such as Yu-Gi-Oh! The Movie, cartoons such as Teenage Mutant Ninja Turtles as well as live-action films such as The Tall Man and the BBC series First Life with Sir David Attenborough. In 2010, he received a nomination for Best Original Score for a Documentary Feature at the International Film Music Critics Association (IFMCA) for his work on The Wildest Dream.

Works

Film and television

Anime and cartoons

Notes

References

External links
 
 
 Interview with Joel Douek

American film score composers
American male film score composers
American television composers
Anime composers
English film score composers
English male film score composers
English television composers
Living people
Male television composers
Year of birth missing (living people)